Kaushik or Kaushike or Koushik/Kousik is a caste of patri-clan (gotra) of Brahmins and Kshatriya named after Brahmarishi Vishvamitra. Kaushik is used as a surname by Brahmins and Kshatriya of Vishwamitra or Kaushika gotra. Kaushik/Koushik is ancient Indian 'Gotra' applied to an Indian clan. Origin of Kaushik can be referenced to an ancient Hindu text. There was a Rishi (saint) by the name of "Vishvamitra" literally meaning 'friend of the universe', 'Vishwa' as in universe and 'Mitra' as in friend, he was also called as Rishi "Kaushik".Vishvamitra is famous in many legendary stories and in different works of Hindu literature. Kaushika is pravara of Vishwamitra gotra.

Etymology
The name "Koushika" (i.e. Kaushik) literally means "descended from Kusha".

Other theories

British writer John Garrett (1871) believed that Kush here refers to the name of a place in Central Asia. According to Robert Vane Russell, Kaushik and be derived from Kusha grass.

Notable people

Notable people with the surname include:

Sports
Shivil Kaushik, Indian cricketer
Manish Kaushik (boxer), Indian boxer
Haripal Kaushik, Indian field hockey player, military officer and television commentator
Jagannathan Kaushik, Indian cricketer
Ankit Kaushik, Indian cricketer
Aditya Kaushik, Indian cricketer

Entertainers
Ashutosh Kaushik, Indian actor
Amar Kaushik, Indian director and actor
Satish Kaushik, Indian film director, producer, and actor
Kavita Kaushik, Indian actress 
Dinesh Kaushik, Indian actor
Aravind Kaushik, Indian film director, screenwriter who works in Kannada cinema
Tashu Kaushik, Indian film actress and model
Kabeer Kaushik, Indian film director and screenwriter
Rishi Kaushik, Indian actor

Politicians
Dharamlal Kaushik, Indian politician from the Bharatiya Janta Party
Madan Kaushik, Indian politician from Bharatiya Janata Party
Anil Kaushik, Indian National Congress politician from Maharashtra
Dinesh Kaushik (politician), Indian politician from Haryana
Ramesh Chander Kaushik, Indian politician from Haryana
Purushottam Kaushik, Indian politician
Naresh Kaushik, Indian politician from Haryana

Others
Ravindra Kaushik, Indian Research and Analysis Wing (RAW) agent who lived undercover in Pakistan
Bhupendra Nath Kaushik, Indian Hindi and Urdu language poet, writer and satirist
Ramanath Cowsik, astrophysicist
Augustya singh Kaushik, Studied mechanical Engineering and working for google
Kaushik Ahmed Reza, Bangladeshi Engineer working in Huawei.
Vanshika Kaushik

References 

Brahmin gotras
Surnames of Indian origin
Indian surnames